Several ships of the Swedish Navy have been named HSwMS Sundsvall, named after the city of Sundsvall:

  was a ship launched in 1675
  was a  launched in 1942 and decommissioned in 1982
  is a  launched in 1991 and commissioned in 1993

Swedish Navy ship names